The Governor Benjamin T. Romualdez General Hospital and Schistosomiasis Center is a public hospital in the Palo, Philippines. It was originally created as a research arm of the Schistosomiasis Control and Research Service and to provide clinical services to patients of Schistosomiasis in the country. Formerly named as Schistosomiasis Control and Research Hospital, it is now authorized to service up to one hundred beds.

References

Hospitals in the Philippines